Miguel A. Torres (born 1941) is a Spanish winemaker, author and businessman.  He is President and Managing Director of Bodegas Torres, and is a member of the fourth generation of this family business. He also manages the company’s vineyards in Chile and collaborates with his sister Marimar Torres in California.

Early life 
In 1957, he started his degree in Chemical Sciences at the University of Barcelona, two years later transferring to the University of Dijon (Bourgogne), where he specialised in oenology and viticulture.

In 1962, he joined the family business, of which he is currently President and Managing Director. Five years after joining the company he married Waltraud Maczassek, a painter and fine arts graduate, who from the very first has collaborated with the company in sales management on the German market.
In 1982-1983 he extended his viticulture and oenology studies at the University of Montpellier (France), having taken a sabbatical year.

Writings on wines 
Miguel A. Torres has published various books about the world of wine. His first book, Viñas y Vinos, (Vineyards and Wines) is currently in its fourth edition in Spanish, revised and updated by Plaza y Janes in 1993 and translated into Catalan, French, English, German, Norwegian, Finnish and Japanese. This first effort was followed by Vino español, un incierto futuro (Spanish Wine, an Uncertain Future) (1979); Manual de los vinos de Cataluña (Manual of Catalan Wines) (1982); Los vinos de España (The Wines of Spain) (1983); Guía Folio de los Vinos de España (Guide sheet to Spanish Wines) (1985); and Els Vins del Penedès (Wines of the Penedès) (1987). Likewise he also edited Enciclopedia del Vino (Encyclopaedia of Wine) for the editorial Orbis.

Bibliography 
Viñas y vinos (Vineyards and Wines), Plaza & Janés Editores, 1996. 
Els vins del Penedès (Wines of the Penedès), Nuevo Arte Thor, 1987. 
Los vinos de España (The Wines of Spain), Ediciones Castell, 1983. 
Vino español: un incierto futuro (Spanish Wine, an Uncertain Future), Editorial Blume, 1979. 
Manual de los vinos de Cataluña (Manual of Catalan Wines) (1982)
Guía Folio de los vinos de España (Guide Sheet to Spanish Wines) (1985)

Awards 
In 1996 the government of Chile awarded him the Bernardo O’Higgins Order, Grand Officier, in acknowledgement for services towards the improvement of relations between Chile and Spain, as well as contribution to vinicultural development in Chile.
In 2002 the magazine Decanter selected him as “Decanter Man of the Year 2002”.
In 2005 he received the Personality of the Year award by the magazine Wine International.

References

Further reading

Salvat Dictionary of Wine. Mauricio Wiesenthal. Salvat editores, 20001.

External links 
Bodegas Torres website (in English, Catalan, Spanish and Swedish)

1941 births
Living people
Spanish businesspeople
Businesspeople from Catalonia
Spanish winemakers